Long Draw Reservoir is a reservoir located in the Rocky Mountains of northern Colorado in the United States.

The Long Draw Campground is located just north of the reservoir.

History
The reservoir began when construction began in 1927. Much of the land for the reservoir was part of Rocky Mountain National Park before being transferred to the U.S. Forest Service in 1924.

In 2011 the National Park Service approved the restoration of native greenback cutthroat trout as part of the reservoir's 30-year re-authorization.

Dam
The dam, Long Draw Dam, (National ID  # CO00140) is an 84-foot tall earthen dam completed in 1975. The dam is owned by Water Supply & Storage Company and is used for irrigation.

References

Lakes of Larimer County, Colorado
Reservoirs in Colorado
Roosevelt National Forest